Metalimnobia is a genus of crane fly in the family Limoniidae.

Species
Subgenus Lasiolimonia Alexander, 1976
M. marlieri (Alexander, 1976)
M. oligotricha (Alexander, 1955)
M. tigripes (Alexander, 1948)
Subgenus Metalimnobia Matsumura, 1911
M. annulifemur (de Meijere, 1913)
M. biannulata (Brunetti, 1912)
M. bifasciata (Schrank, 1781)
M. brahma (Alexander, 1965)
M. californica (Osten Sacken, 1861)
M. charlesi Salmela & Stary, 2009
M. cinctipes (Say, 1823)
M. dietziana (Alexander, 1927)
M. dualis Savchenko, 1986
M. eusebeia (Alexander, 1966)
M. fallax (Johnson, 1909)
M. hedone (Alexander, 1959)
M. hudsonica (Osten Sacken, 1861)
M. immatura (Osten Sacken, 1860)
M. improvisa (Alexander, 1933)
M. jactator (Alexander, 1959)
M. lanceolata Savchenko, 1983
M. megastigma (Alexander, 1922)
M. mendax (Alexander, 1924)
M. novaeangliae (Alexander, 1929)
M. quadrimaculata (Linnaeus, 1760)
M. quadrinotata (Meigen, 1818)
M. solitaria (Osten Sacken, 1860)
M. tenua Savchenko, 1976
M. triocellata (Osten Sacken, 1860)
M. triphaea (Alexander, 1954)
M. xanthopteroides (Riedel, 1917)
M. yunnanica (Edwards, 1928)
M. zetterstedti (Tjeder, 1968)
Subgenus Tricholimonia Alexander, 1965
M. compta (Alexander, 1920)
M. congoensis (Alexander, 1920)
M. edwardsi (Alexander, 1920)
M. grahami (Alexander, 1920)
M. humfreyi (Alexander, 1920)
M. imitatrix (Alexander, 1923)
M. renaudi (Alexander, 1955)
M. schoutedeni (Alexander, 1923)
M. sparsisetosa (Alexander, 1972)
M. zernyana (Alexander, 1956)

References

Limoniidae
Nematocera genera